The Treasurer of the Navy, originally called Treasurer of Marine Causes or Paymaster of the Navy, was a civilian officer of the Royal Navy, one of the principal commissioners of the Navy Board responsible for naval finance from 1524 to 1832. The treasurer was based at the Navy Pay Office.

History
Originally established in 1524, the first holder of the post was William Gonson; he held the office for twenty years until 1544. Although a member of the board, his office was semi-autonomous. The office-holder was responsible for the direction and control of the finance of the Royal Navy. The office was a political appointment and frequently was held by up-and-coming young politicians who would later go on to hold more important positions.  Before 1832 all accounts were dealt with by a number of different offices and officials. The Treasurer of the Navy originated during the reign of Henry VIII. He was the senior member of the Navy Board responsible for all Navy accounts; he gradually withdrew during the seventeenth century from the board's day-to-day affairs and his office, and the Navy Pay Office, came to be regarded as entirely separate from the Navy Office. The Treasurer of the Navy survived the re-organisational changes of 1832, but the office was abolished in 1835 and its duties were transferred to the Paymaster General's' Office.

Treasurers of the Navy 1524–1836
Notable holders of this post included:

Departments and offices under Treasurer
Included:
 Navy Pay Office (1546–1832) This was in effect the larger part of the Treasurer of the Navy’s Department.
 Department of the Accountant-General of the Navy (1829–1832)

References

Sources
 Sainty, J. C. (2003), A provisional list: Navy Treasurer c. 1546–1836, The Institute of Historical Research (IHR),  School of Advanced Study at the University of London

External links
Office-Holders: Navy Treasurer

Defence ministers of the United Kingdom
T
16th-century Royal Navy personnel
1836 disestablishments
Defunct ministerial offices in the United Kingdom
Navy
1546 establishments in England